Kettering was a Free Village in Trelawny, Jamaica. It is now part of Duncans. It was named after Kettering in England, the birthplace of William Knibb, its founder.

Amenities
Kettering Baptist Church, founded 1844

References 

Populated places in Jamaica